Wings of Danger, released in the United States as Dead on Course, is a 1952 British crime film directed by Terence Fisher and starring Zachary Scott, Robert Beatty and Kay Kendall. The screenplay concerns a pilot who is suspected of smuggling.

Plot
At Spencer Airlines in England, American pilot Richard "Van" Van Ness (Zachary Scott) tries to stop his friend, Nick Talbot (Robert Beatty), from taking off in a storm. Nick threatens to tell their boss, Boyd Spencer (Arthur Lane), that Van suffers from blackouts. Next morning, Van's fears come true when debris from Nick's aircraft wash ashore.

Van tells Spencer who does not seem to care about Nick dying. Van asks Spencer's girl friend, Alexia LaRoche (Kay Kendall) to exchange pounds for dollars. The following night, he visits his girl friend, Nick's sister Avril (Naomi Chance) who is being blackmailed by a man named Snell (Harold Lang) to keep her father from discovering Nick's post-war black market business.

Van forces Snell to confess and learns that a set of tools are to be delivered to Cherbourg for Spencer. Van locates the box of tools in the storage room, however, another man runs from the room and escapes on a motorcycle. Customs officer, Inspector Maxwell (Colin Tapley) discovers the tools are made of solid gold.

Later, the bellboy is shot driving Van's car to the front door, and Van has Snell arrested. Alexia reveals that Spencer has in his office, a coded notebook with financial information. Van breaks into Spencer's darkened office and finds the notebook, but hears Spencer collapse and sees the man from the storage building rush out to his motorcycle.

Van follows but suffers a blackout and crashes his car. The mysterious man rescues him and takes him the cottage that Nick and his girl friend Jeanette (Diane Cilento) share. Nick admits he faked his death because was wanted by the French police and Spencer knew that. Nick also knows Spencer has been making counterfeit dollars from old Nazi forging plates.

Van and Nick confront Spencer but Nick is shot. Van leaves Nick with Jeanette and Avril and returns with Maxwell. Together they chase Spencer to the airport. He flies away, but his engines fail and he quickly crashes and dies. Nick is also dying but tells Avril that Van is afraid to marry her because of his blackouts.

Van tells Avril that he is leaving town for a while to think things over but just as his aircraft is about to take off Avril tells the pilot to leave without him.

Cast

 Zachary Scott as Richard Van Ness
 Robert Beatty as Nick Talbot
 Naomi Chance as Avril Talbot
 Kay Kendall as Alexia LaRoche
 Colin Tapley as Inspector Maxwell
 Arthur Lane as Boyd Spencer 
 Harold Lang as Snell, the blackmailer 
 Diane Cilento as Jeannette 
 Jack Allen as Tniscott 
 Douglas Muir as Doctor Wilner  
 Ian Fleming as Talbot
 Larry Taylor as O'Gorman, henchman 
 Darcy Conyers as Signals Officer 
 Sheila Raynor as Nurse 
 Nigel Neilson as Duty Officer (uncredited) 
 Courtney Hope as Mrs Clarence, hotel tenant  
 Anthony T. Miles as Sam, Desk Clerk  
 James Steele as First Flying Officer 
 Russ Allen as Second Flying Officer 
 June Ashley as Blonde in Sportscar (uncredited)
 June Mitchell as Blonde in Sportscar (uncredited)
 Natasha Sokolova as Blonde in Sportscar (uncredited)

Production
Wings of Danger was based on the 1951 novel Dead on Course by Trevor Dudley Smith and Packham Webb. The film was made by Hammer Films and shot at the Riverside Studios in Hammersmith. Production began in late September 1951 with location shooting in Rye, East Sussex.

The aircraft used in Wings of Danger are:
 De Havilland DH.89A Dominie, c/n 6886, G-AGSI
 Percival Proctor Mk II, c/n H548, G-AIIL

Reception
In Britain Wings of Danger was released on a double bill with FBI Girl (1951), enjoying a certain amount of success at the box office.

Aviation film historian Stephen Pendo in Aviation in the Cinema (1985) compared Wings of Danger to the "dull" Arctic Flight (1952), stating, that Arctic Flight  "... was still better than 'Wings of Danger', a British film with Zachary Scott as an airline pilot mixed up in a smuggling web or counterfeiting ring, depending on how one interprets the vague plot."

References

Notes

Citations

Bibliography

 Pendo, Stephen. Aviation in the Cinema. Lanham, Maryland: Scarecrow Press, 1985. .

External links
 
 

1952 films
1952 crime drama films
1950s crime thriller films
British aviation films
British crime drama films
British crime thriller films
Films directed by Terence Fisher
Films scored by Malcolm Arnold
Films based on British novels
British black-and-white films
Films set in England
Films shot in East Sussex
Films shot at Riverside Studios
Hammer Film Productions films
1950s English-language films
1950s British films